A History of Violence is a 2005 action thriller film directed by David Cronenberg and written by Josh Olson. It is an adaptation of the 1997 graphic novel of the same title by John Wagner and Vince Locke. The film stars Viggo Mortensen, Maria Bello, William Hurt, and Ed Harris. In the film, Tom Stall, a diner owner, becomes a local hero after he foils an attempted robbery, but is threatened by a gangster Carl Fogarty, where Tom must face his past and also protect his family. 

A History of Violence was in the main competition for the 2005 Palme d'Or, and was put into a limited release in the United States on September 23, 2005, followed by a wide release on September 30, 2005. It is sometimes considered one of the greatest films of the 2000s. The film was specifically praised for its performances, screenplay, atmosphere, and story. William Hurt was nominated for the Academy Award for Best Supporting Actor, while Olson was nominated for Best Adapted Screenplay. Mortensen himself praised it as "one of the best movies [he's] ever been in, if not the best", also declaring it was a "perfect film noir" or "close to perfect". It is also notable as being one of the last major Hollywood films to be released on VHS.

Plot

Tom Stall is a diner owner who lives in small-town Indiana with his wife Edie and his children Jack and Sarah. One night, two spree killers enter Tom's restaurant, threaten those inside, and sexually assault one of his employees. Tom deftly kills them and is hailed a hero, while the incident makes national news. A few days later, Tom is visited by a man named Carl Fogarty, who alleges that Tom is actually Joey Cusack, a former gangster with the Irish mob in Philadelphia. Tom vehemently denies this, but Carl remains persistent and begins to stalk the Stalls. Under pressure, Tom's relationship with Edie, Jack, and Sarah faces continued strain.

Following an argument with Tom over the use of violence at school, Jack runs away, only to be captured and held hostage by Carl. Carl confronts Tom and demands his return to Philadelphia in exchange for his son's release. After Jack is freed, Tom manages to kill Carl's henchmen until Carl shoots him. A wounded Tom drops his façade and manifests his former self, but Jack shoots and kills Carl with a shotgun before he can fight back. At the hospital, a furious Edie confronts Tom, who admits to being Joey Cusack, revealing that he started a new life to escape his past. Tom becomes further isolated from the rest of his family and the community. 

One day, Tom receives a phone call from his estranged brother, Richie Cusack, who demands his return. Returning to Philadelphia, Tom learns that his past actions have delayed Richie's advancement with the Irish mob. Tom offers peace, but Richie orders his men to kill his brother. Tom manages to escape from being strangled to death; he kills the gangsters and confronts Richie before shooting him dead. After returning home to find his family eating dinner, Tom is offered food by Jack and Sarah, signaling his acceptance back into their lives.

Cast

Production
The film is loosely based on the original graphic novel. Screenwriter Josh Olson intended from the beginning to use the original story as a springboard to explore the themes that interested him.

In a 2014 interview, Mortensen said he read Olson's original version of the script and "was quite disappointed. It was 120-odd pages of just mayhem; kind of senseless, really." He only agreed to do the movie after meeting with Cronenberg, who (according to Mortensen) reworked the script.

Most of the film was shot in Millbrook, Ontario. The shopping centre scene was shot in Tottenham, Ontario, and the climactic scene was shot at the historic Eaton Hall Mansion, located in King City, Ontario. Harrison Ford turned down the role of Tom Stall.

Alternate versions
The U.S. and European versions differ on only two fight scenes - one where Tom breaks the nose of one of Fogarty's thugs and one where he stomps on the throat of one of Richie Cusack's thugs. Both scenes display more blood flowing or gushing out of the victims in the European version. In addition, a more pronounced bone-crushing sound effect is used when Tom stomps on the thug's throat.

A deleted scene, known as "Scene 44", features a dream sequence in the diner, where Fogarty tells Tom he will kill his family and him, to which Tom responds by shooting him with his shotgun at close range. He then approaches Fogarty's mangled body, which raises a gun and shoots him.  In the DVD extras' on-set footage, Mortensen suggests Harris should pull the gun from his chest cavity. Cronenberg, while amused by the idea, rejects it for being too self-referential; he cites a sequence in his film Videodrome, in which a character pulls a handgun from a slit in his stomach.

Interpretation
The film's title plays on multiple levels of meaning. Film critic Roger Ebert stated that Cronenberg refers to three possibilities:

Cronenberg himself described the film as a meditation on the human body and its relationship to violence:

For me the first fact of human existence is the human body. I'm not an atheist, but for me to turn away from any aspect of the human body to me is a philosophical betrayal. And there's a lot of art and religion whose whole purpose is to turn away from the human body. I feel in my art that my mandate is to not do that. So whether it's beautiful things—the sexuality part, or the violent part or the gooey part—it's just body fluids. It's when Elliott in Dead Ringer (sic) says, "Why are there no beauty contests for the insides of bodies?" It's a thought that disturbs me. How can we be disgusted by our own bodies? That really doesn't make any human sense. It makes some animal sense but it doesn't make human sense so I'm always discussing that in my movies and in this movie in particular. I don't ever feel that I've been exploitive in a crude, vulgar way, or just doing it to get attention. It's always got a purpose which I can be very articulate about. In this movie, we've got an audience that's definitely going to applaud these acts of violence and they do because it's set up that these acts are justifiable and almost heroic at times. But I'm saying, "Okay, if you can applaud that, can you applaud this?" because this is the result of that gunshot in the head. It's not nice. And even if the violence is justifiable, the consequences of the violence are exactly the same. The body does not know what was the morality of that act. So I'm asking the audience to see if they can contain the whole experience of this violent act instead of just the heroic/dramatic one. I'm saying "Here's the really nasty effects on these nasty guys but still, the effects are very nasty." And that's the paradox and conundrum."

Music
The soundtrack to A History of Violence was released on October 11, 2005.

Release

Theatrical
A History of Violence premiered at the Cannes Film Festival in May 2005, and was released in the United States on September 30 following a successful limited release on September 23, 2005.

Home media
The film was released on DVD and VHS formats on March 14, 2006, and was reported by the Los Angeles Times as being the last major Hollywood film to be released on VHS.

Reception

Box office
The film started with a limited release in 14 theaters and grossed $515,992 at the box office, averaging $36,856 per theater. A week later, it went on a wide release in 1,340 theaters and grossed $8.1 million over the weekend. During its entire theatrical run, the film grossed $31.5 million in the United States and a total of $61.4 million worldwide.

Critical response
Review aggregator Rotten Tomatoes gives the film an approval rating of 87% based on 215 critics' reviews, with an average rating of 7.90/10. The website's critics consensus reads, "A History of Violence raises compelling and thoughtful questions about the nature of violence, while representing a return to form for director David Cronenberg in one of his more uncharacteristic pieces." On Metacritic, the film has an average score of 81 out of 100, based on 37 critics, indicating "universal acclaim". Audiences polled by CinemaScore gave the film an average grade of "C+" on an A+ to F scale.

Rolling Stone critic Peter Travers gave the film four stars, highlighting its "explosive power and subversive wit", and lauded David Cronenberg as a "world-class director, at the top of his startlingly creative form". Entertainment Weekly reviewer Lisa Schwarzbaum gave the film an A, concluding that "David Cronenberg's brilliant movie" was "without a doubt one of the very best of the year". 

Manohla Dargis of The New York Times called the film a "mindblower", and noted Cronenberg's "refusal to let us indulge in movie violence without paying a price". Roger Ebert also gave the film a positive review, observing, "A History of Violence seems deceptively straightforward, coming from a director with Cronenberg's quirky complexity, but think again. This is not a movie about plot, but about character." He gave it three and a half out of four stars.

It was ranked the best film of 2005 in the Village Voice Film Poll.

In December 2005, it was named to the Toronto International Film Festival's annual Canada's top-ten list of the year's best Canadian films.

BBC film critic Mark Kermode named the film the best of 2005.

Retrospective lists

Empire named the film the 448th-greatest film of all time. 

The French film magazine Cahiers du cinéma ranked the film as fifth place in its list of best films of the decade, 2000–2009.

In his list of best films of the decade, Peter Travers named this number four, praising director David Cronenberg:

Is Canadian director David Cronenberg the most unsung maverick artist in movies? Bet on it ... Cronenberg knows violence is wired into our DNA. His film showed how we secretly crave what we publicly condemn. This is potent poison for a thriller, and unadulterated, unforgettable Cronenberg.

In 2016, the film was ranked among the 100 greatest films since 2000 in an international critics' poll by 177 critics around the world.

Accolades

References

External links

 
 
 
 
 

2005 films
2005 crime thriller films
2005 drama films
2000s English-language films
2000s American films
2000s Canadian films
2000s crime thriller films
American crime thriller films
American drama films
American neo-noir films
Canadian crime thriller films
Canadian drama films
English-language Canadian films
English-language German films
Films about Irish-American culture
Films about the Irish Mob
Films about violence
Films based on Vertigo Comics titles
Films directed by David Cronenberg
Films scored by Howard Shore
Films set in Indiana
Films set in Philadelphia
Films shot in Ohio
Films shot in Toronto
Fratricide in fiction
Irish-American culture in Philadelphia
Live-action films based on comics
Midlife crisis films
New Line Cinema films
Canadian gangster films